Mondsee may refer to:

 Mondsee (lake), lake in Austria
 Mondsee (town), town in Austria